Ebba, also known as Aabba and Ubba, is a village in the Nabatieh Governorate region of southern Lebanon located between Nabatieh and Tyr, north of the Litani River.

Etymology and meaning 
There are many possibilities in determining the origin of the word "ebba; aba or ubba". They are either Syriac word "ܥ ܒ ܐ" may mean forest; or Arabic is derived from the word "ALEBB / العِبّ"; or linked to on behalf of a tribe or family "Abbou /عِبّو". But among the common people of the town that the word back to the original Syriac means the forest.

History
In 1875 Victor Guérin   found the village to have 300 Metuali inhabitants.

Area and location 
The village is located approximately 12 kilometers from Nabatieh and 84 kilometers from Beirut, and rises approximately 250 –300 meters from the sea level.

The total area of this village is  7.42 km2, about 35% of the area of town occupied by full of buildings and institutions and the rest divided between agricultural land, republic land and WAQF land. The cultivated area is about 55% of the limits of the town, while the estimated length of the road network is about 35 km linear.

Several valleys separate EBBA from the nearest villages: Ansar, Doueir, Jebchit, Harouf, Adchit and Zrarieh.

Demographics 
EBBA, is a majority Shia Muslims village with 9000 as a total population.

The name of families living in EBBA:

Education 
There are two schools in the village, one private school and one intermediate public school.

References

Bibliography

External links 

  
 Information about Ebba from LOCALIBAN 
Aabba, Localiban 

Populated places in Nabatieh District
Shia Muslim communities in Lebanon